Henryk Mikolaj Górecki: Already It Is Dusk/"Lerchenmusik" is a studio album by the Kronos Quartet and the London Sinfonietta. The two compositions are by Polish composer Henryk Górecki. The Kronos Quartet play "Already It Is Dusk," which they would reissue on Henryk Górecki: String Quartets Nos. 1 and 2.

Track listing

Credits

Musicians
Track 1:
David Harrington – violin
John Sherba – violin
Hank Dutt – viola
Joan Jeanrenaud – cello
Track 2:
London Sinfonietta

Production
Track 1 recorded July 1990 at Skywalker Sound, Nicasio, California

See also
List of 1991 albums

Kronos Quartet albums
1991 classical albums
Nonesuch Records albums
Compositions by Henryk Górecki